The Motra Tone is a half-length portrait of a woman by the Albanian artist Kolë Idromeno. Idromeno painted it in 1883. The picture is part of the collection of National Art Gallery of Albania.

References

Albanian art
1883 paintings